Flore du Cambodge, du Laos et du Viêtnam is a multi-volume flora describing the vascular plants of Cambodia, Laos, and Vietnam, published by the National Museum of Natural History in Paris since the 1960s. It currently consists of 35 volumes.

Volumes
Volume 35 (2014): Solanaceae
Volume 34 (2014): Polygalaceae
Volume 33 (2014): Apocynaceae
Volume 32 (2004): Myrsinaceae
Volume 31 (2003): Gentianaceae
Volume 30 (2001): Leguminosae - Papilionoideae - Millettieae
Volume 29 (1997): Leguminoseuses, Papilionoidees, Dalbergiees
Volume 28 (1995): Gymnospermae
Volume 27 (1994): Legumineuses - Desmodiees
Volume 26 (1992): Rhoipteleacees, Juglandacees, Thymelaeacees, Proteacees, Primulacees, Styracacees
Volume 25 (1990): Dipterocarpacees
Volume 24 (1989): Caryophyllales
Volume 23 (1987): Legumineuses-Papilionoidees
Volume 22 (1985): Bignoniacees
Volume 21 (1985): Scrophulariaceae
Volume 20 (1983): Pandanaceae, Sparganiaceae, Ruppiaceae, Aponogetonaceae, Smilaceae, Philydraceae, Hanuanaceae, Flagellariaceae, Restionaceae, Centrolepidaceae, Lowiaceae, Xyridaceae
Volume 19 (1981): Leguminosae, Mimosoideae
Volume 18 (1980): Leguminosae, Cesalpiniodeae
Volume 17 (1979): Leguminosae, Phaseoleae
Volume 16 (1977): Symplocaceae
Volume 15 (1975): Cucurbitaceae
Volume 14 (1973): Ochnaceae, Onagraceae, Trapaceae, Balanophoraceae, Rafflesiaceae, Podostemacea, Tristichaceae
Volume 13 (1972): Loganiaceae, Buddlejaceae
Volume 12 (1970): Hernandiaceae
Volume 11 (1970): Flacourtiaceae, Bixaceae, Cochlospermaceae
Volume 10 (1969): Combretaceae: O.Lecompte
Volume 9 (1969): Campanulaceae
Volume 8 (1968): Nyssaceae, Cornaceae, Alangiaceae
Volume 7 (1968): Rosaceae (2)
Volume 6 (1968): Rosaceae (1)
Volume 5 (1967): Umbelliferae, Aizoaceae, Molluginaceae, Passifloraceae
Volume 4 (1965): Saxifragaceae, Crypteroniaceae, Droseraceae, Hamamelidaceae, Haloragaceae, Rhizophoraceae, Sonneratiaceae, Punicaceae
Volume 3 (1963): Sapotacees
Volume 2 (1962): Anacardiaceae, Moringaceae, Connaraceae
Volume 1 (1960): Sabiaceae

Meetings
1st International symposium on the Flora of Cambodia, Laos and Vietnam (2008) - Phnom Penh, Cambodia. 
2nd International symposium on the Flora of Cambodia, Laos and Vietnam (2010) - Hanoi, Vietnam.
3rd International symposium on the Flora of Cambodia, Laos and Vietnam (2015) - Vientiane, Laos.

See also
 Flora of Thailand
 Flora Malesiana

References

Florae (publication)
Botany in Asia